Twinnies may refer to:
 Twinnies (duo),  a musical duo from Bavaria
 Natalie and Nadiya Anderson, Survivor contestants